The Penns Grove-Carneys Point Regional School District is a comprehensive regional public school district serving students in pre-kindergarten through twelfth grade from Carneys Point Township and Penns Grove, two communities in Salem County, New Jersey, United States. A majority of students in grades 9-12 from Oldmans Township attend the district's high school as part of a sending/receiving relationship with the Oldmans Township School District, with the balance attending Woodstown High School in the Woodstown-Pilesgrove Regional School District.

As of the 2018–19 school year, the district, comprised of five schools, had an enrollment of 2,185 students and 182.0 classroom teachers (on an FTE basis), for a student–teacher ratio of 12.0:1.

The district is classified by the New Jersey Department of Education as being in District Factor Group "A", the lowest of eight groupings. District Factor Groups organize districts statewide to allow comparison by common socioeconomic characteristics of the local districts. From lowest socioeconomic status to highest, the categories are A, B, CD, DE, FG, GH, I and J.

Schools 
Schools in the district (with 2018–19 enrollment data from the National Center for Education Statistics) are:
Elementary schools
Lafayette-Pershing School with 331 students in grades Pre-K to Kindergarten
Candy Shockley, Interim Principal
Field Street School with 480 students in grades 1 - 3
Mary Kwiatkowski, Principal 
Paul W. Carleton School with 355 students in grades 4 - 5
Cameron Baynes, Principal 
Middle school
Penns Grove Middle School with 465 students in grades 6 - 8
Dr. Tara Allen, Principal
Abner Mendoza, Assistant Principal
High school
Penns Grove High School with 508 students in grades 9 - 12
Lory O'Brien, Principal
Kerry Heathwaite, Assistant Principal
Anwar Golden, Assistant Principal & Athletic Director

Administration
Core members of the district's administration are:
Dr. Zenaida Cobián, Superintendent
Christopher DeStratis, School Business Administrator / Board Secretary

Board of education
The district's board of education, with nine members, sets policy and oversees the fiscal and educational operation of the district through its administration. As a Type II school district, the board's trustees are elected directly by voters to serve three-year terms of office on a staggered basis, with three seats up for election each year held (since 2012) as part of the November general election.

References

External links 
Penns Grove - Carneys Point Regional School District

School Data for the Penns Grove - Carneys Point Regional School District, National Center for Education Statistics

Carneys Point Township, New Jersey
Penns Grove, New Jersey
New Jersey District Factor Group A
School districts in Salem County, New Jersey